Spålen–Katnosa Nature Reserve is a nature reserve  in Nordmarka, Norway. 

It was established in 1995 and encompasses portions of the municipalities Lunner and Jevnaker in Oppland and of Ringerike  in Buskerud. The area is characterised by forested hills dominated by spruce. The reserve covers an area of 18 km² principally of woods and wetlands, including lake Katnosa.

References

Nature reserves in Norway
Protected areas of Innlandet
Protected areas of Viken